Portrait of Captain Thomas Coram is a 1740 portrait of philanthropist Thomas Coram painted by William Hogarth. The portrait, which represents Hogarth's highest achievement in direct portraiture, was not created as a commission and was instead donated to Coram's Foundling Hospital. The portrait is divided into two sections: The left side represents Coram's sea ventures, a major source of his wealth. The right side shows a curtain pulled over a mother figure with a child.

The painting is now in the collection of London's Foundling Museum.

References

Paintings by William Hogarth
1740 paintings
Paintings in London